The 2017 Ottawa Gee-Gees football team represented the University of Ottawa in the 2017 U Sports football season. They were led by fifth-year head coach Jamie Barresi and played their home games at Gee-Gees Field. They are a member of the Ontario University Athletics conference. They began their season on August 27, where they defeated the Guelph Gryphons in overtime on the road. Their season ended in the OUA Quarter-Final playoff game against the same Gryphons by a score of 30–8.

Personnel

Coaching staff

Schedule

Schedule Source:

References

2017 in Canadian football
Ottawa Gee-Gees football seasons
Ottawa Gee-Gees football